Her Lord and Master is a 1921 American silent comedy film directed by Edward José and starring Alice Joyce, Holmes Herbert and Frank Sheridan. It is based on the 1902 play of the same title by Martha Morton.

Cast
 Alice Joyce as Indiana Stillwater
 Holmes Herbert as R. Honorable Thurston Ralph, Viscount Canning
 Walter McEwen as Lord Nelson Stafford
 Frank Sheridan as Fred Stillwater
 Marie Shotwell as Mrs. Stillwater
 Louise Beaudet as Mrs. Chazy Bunker
 Eugene Acker as Glen Masters
 John Sutherland as Jennings
 Ida Waterman as Lady Canning

References

Bibliography
 Goble, Alan. The Complete Index to Literary Sources in Film. Walter de Gruyter, 1999.

External links
 

1921 films
1921 comedy films
1920s English-language films
American silent feature films
Silent American comedy films
American black-and-white films
Films directed by Edward José
Vitagraph Studios films
Films set in England
1920s American films